Major General Peter Gilchrist  (born 28 February 1952) is a retired senior British Army officer who served as Master-General of the Ordnance from 2000 to 2004.

Military career
Educated at Marlborough College, Gilchrist was commissioned into the Royal Tank Regiment in 1973. He became Commanding Officer of the 1st Royal Tank Regiment in 1993, Deputy Director of Ordnance in 1996 and Programme Director for Armoured Systems in 1998. He went on to be an executive director at the Defence Procurement Agency and Master-General of the Ordnance in 2000. He was deployed Afghanistan as Deputy Commander at Combined Forces Command in 2004, and then became Head of the British Defence Staff and Defence Attaché in Washington, D.C. in 2006. He retired in 2009.

References

 

|-

|-

1952 births
British Army major generals
British military attachés
British Army personnel of the War in Afghanistan (2001–2021)
Companions of the Order of the Bath
Living people
Royal Tank Regiment officers